Cryptobothrus is a genus of short-horned grasshoppers in the family Acrididae. There is one described species in Cryptobothrus, C. chrysophorus, found in Australia.

References

External links

 

Acrididae